Àngels Martínez i Castells is an economist and Spanish politician. From 2015 to 2017 she represented Barcelona in the Parliament of Catalonia.

Life and career
Castells was born in Mollet del Vallès. She attended the University of Barcelona, where she graduated with a doctorate in economics, having previously also studied commerce, philosophy, literature, and law. Her thesis was directed by Fabián Estapé, in which she studied governance in Portugal following the Carnation Revolution.

After her PhD, Castells became a professor of economic policy in the Faculty of Economic and Business Sciences at the University of Barcelona.

In 2000, Castells was the Vice President of the Pere Ardiaca Foundation.

Castells was a founding member of the United and Alternative Left, a Catalonian political party. She served for years as a member of the National Council of that party.

Castells ran for European Parliament for the United and Alternative Left in 1999, and in 2004 she was again on the United and Alternative Left ticket, but she was not elected.

In 2009, Castells co-founded, and then chaired, the public health platform Dempeus per la Salut Pública. In 2013, she was elected to the Scientific Council of the Association for the Taxation of Financial Transactions and for Citizens' Action.

In May 2015, Castells was ranked in the 32nd place on the party list of the Barcelona en Comú in the municipal elections. In July 2015, she was elected in a primary election to hold the second position on the list of Podemos for the Catalonian parliamentary elections. After the coalition Catalunya Sí que es Pot was formed, she was also highly placed on the resultant party list, and she was elected to the Parliament of Catalonia where she served until 2017.

References

Living people
21st-century Spanish women politicians
Women politicians from Catalonia
Members of the 11th Parliament of Catalonia
Women economists
Spanish women economists
Spanish economists
Economists from Catalonia
University of Barcelona alumni
Academic staff of the University of Barcelona
Year of birth missing (living people)